Louis Pierre Paul Van Tilt (born 28 March 1875, date of death unknown) was a Belgian sport shooter who competed in the 1920 Summer Olympics and in the 1924 Summer Olympics.

In 1920, he won the silver medal as member of the Belgian team in the team clay pigeons competition. Four years later, he was part of the Belgian team which finished fourth in the team clay pigeons competition. He also participated in the individual trap event but his result is unknown.

References

1875 births
Year of death missing
Belgian male sport shooters
Olympic shooters of Belgium
Shooters at the 1920 Summer Olympics
Shooters at the 1924 Summer Olympics
Olympic silver medalists for Belgium
Trap and double trap shooters
Olympic medalists in shooting
Medalists at the 1920 Summer Olympics